Hot is a tambon (subdistrict) of Hot District, in Chiang Mai Province, Thailand. In 2019 it had a total population of 3,170 people.

Administration

Central administration
The tambon is subdivided into 5 administrative villages (muban).

Local administration
The whole area of the subdistrict is covered by the subdistrict administrative organization (SAO) Hot (องค์การบริหารส่วนตำบลฮอด).

References

External links
Thaitambon.com on Hot

Tambon of Chiang Mai province
Populated places in Chiang Mai province